Marhemetabad-e Miyani Rural District is in Firuzabad District of Chaharborj County, West Azerbaijan province, Iran. At the National Census of 2006, its population (as a part of the former Marhemetabad District of Miandoab County) was 6,739 in 1,526 households. There were 6,839 inhabitants in 1,836 households at the following census of 2011. At the most recent census of 2016, the population of the rural district was 6,667 in 1,990 households. The largest of its seven villages was Fesenduz, with 2,461 people. Marhemetabad District was separated from Miandoab County, elevated to the status of Chaharborj County, and divided into two districts in 2020.

References 

Rural Districts of West Azerbaijan Province

Populated places in West Azerbaijan Province